Elmer's Flying Jumbos is a Red Baron ride operated at Chessington World of Adventures Resort in London. Originally in the area of Toytown, it later moved to the Zufari area. As of April 2015, the Chessington ride continues to operate. In the Spring of 2020, it was renamed Elmer's Flying Jumbos.

History
Flying Jumbos is a Mini Jet Red Baron from 1987. Manufactured by Preston & Barbieri, it is an aerial carousel spinning ride with elephant-themed cabs, originally pink and now grey.

Africa was Chessington's new area for 2012, after the former area, Toytown, was replaced with a new land in line with Chessington's image as being Britain's Wildest Adventure. Many of the gentle, children's rides such as Flying Jumbos were moved to other areas, leaving only three rides in the area. In 2013  Flying Jumbos opened in the Zufari area. In January 2020, it was announced that a new four-year partnership was created with Chessington World Of Adventures, with the theme of Elmer, a fictional family book character, entering the park and retheming the ride to Elmer's Flying Jumbos.

Description
Riders sit inside fibreglass elephants which rotate like a merry-go-round. Holding down a button makes the elephants fly, or lowers it. Anyone under 1.1 meters must be accompanied by an adult, with a maximum torso measurement of 51 inches.

Gallery

Similar rides
There are similar rides named Flying Jumbos at:
Drayton Manor Theme Park (1998-2007)
Adventure Island
M&D's

See also
Chessington World of Adventures Resort

References

External links

1987 establishments in England
Chessington World of Adventures rides
Amusement rides introduced in 1987
Amusement rides manufactured by Preston & Barbieri